Coeriana is a genus of moths of the family Erebidae. The genus was erected by Francis Walker in 1858.

Species

References

Calpinae